The Prior of Durham was the head of the Roman Catholic Durham Cathedral Priory, founded c. 1083 with the move of a previous house from Jarrow. The succession continued until dissolution of the monastery in 1540, when the priory was replaced with a Church of England deanery church.

After the Benedictine monastery was dissolved, the last Prior of Durham, Hugh Whitehead, became the first dean of the cathedral's secular chapter.

List

Notes

References

 
 
 

 
Durham, England-related lists